Prescott was a town in Hampshire County, Massachusetts.  It was incorporated in 1822 from portions of Pelham and New Salem, and was partially built on Equivalent Lands. It was named in honor of Colonel William Prescott, who commanded the American forces at the Battle of Bunker Hill. It was disincorporated on April 28, 1938, as part of the creation of the Quabbin Reservoir. It was the least populous of the four unincorporated towns, with barely 300 residents by 1900. Upon dissolution, portions of the town were annexed to the adjacent towns of New Salem and Petersham. The majority of the former town (the New Salem portion) is still above water, and is known as the Prescott Peninsula. The public is not allowed on the peninsula except for an annual tour given by the Swift River Valley Historical Society, or for hikes conducted by the Society. None of the land is in Hampshire County any  longer; the New Salem portion is in Franklin County; and the Petersham portion is in Worcester County.

As with the nearby town of Dana, after the dissolution of incorporation, houses were moved or razed, but cellar holes remained. The Prescott First Congregational Church, located in the village of Prescott Four Corners, was moved to South Hadley and is now the home of the Joseph Allen Skinner Museum. 

The former site of Prescott Center was home to the Five College Radio Astronomy Observatory from 1969 to 2011.  Scientific work conducted on the 14-meter radio telescope will be continued on the modern 50-meter Large Millimeter Telescope in Mexico.

Daniel Shays, leader of the 1787 rebellion which bears his name, was a resident of that part of Pelham which later became the southern part of Prescott. The site of his former home is still above water; but the house was gone by 1927, and in any event the site is inaccessible to the general public. The Conkey Tavern, located roughly to the west of the Shays site, was where the Shays Rebellion was largely planned. Its site is now under water.

The Atkinson Tavern, once the centerpiece of the small village of Atkinson Hollow, stands today, renovated and expanded, in West Springfield, Massachusetts as the Storrowton Tavern, on the grounds owned by the Eastern States Exposition. The former Town Hall, once located just south of Atkinson Hollow, is inaccessible to the general public, and stands today off of Route 32 in Petersham.

The village of North Prescott, on the border between Prescott and New Salem, remains partially open to public access. Although the site of the North Prescott Methodist Episcopal Church is vacant, the former parsonage—now a private home which is not open to the public—remains on its original site. The church building itself is today home of the Swift River Valley Historical Society in North New Salem, where it was moved in 1985. Prior to this the church stood at its site on the New Salem line until 1949, when it was initially moved to Orange as home of the former Prescott Historical Society. A few other structures remain.

Prescott House, an on-campus living facility at Hampshire College in Amherst, Massachusetts, is named after the former town.

More Quabbin towns
 Greenwich
 Enfield
 Dana

References

 Tougias, Michael. Quabbin: A History and Explorer's Guide. Yarmouth Port, Massachusetts: On Cape Publications, 2002.

External links
 https://web.archive.org/web/20161017095551/http://menotomymaps.com/quab_1.html. Map showing the towns buried under Quabbin as they looked in 1912 with original house locations and current reservoir water level.

Defunct towns in Massachusetts
Ghost towns in Massachusetts
Populated places in Hampshire County, Massachusetts
1938 disestablishments in Massachusetts
Forcibly depopulated communities in the United States
1822 establishments in Massachusetts
Populated places established in 1822
Populated places disestablished in 1938